Canadian Pacific Hotels (CPH) was a division of the Canadian Pacific Railway (CPR) that primarily operated hotels across Canada. CPR restructured the division as a subsidiary in 1963.

Early hotels

Since passenger revenue made a significant contribution to railway profitability, facilities, such as hotels, were essential for attracting passenger traffic. The three earliest locations (Mount Stephen House, Glacier House and North Bend) were initially only dining stops, necessary because steep railway grades made hauling a dining car uneconomical. Thomas Sorby's design for these three hotels was inspired by Swiss Chalets.

 
Hotels were established mainly at locations that connected with other passenger rail or ferry routes, but some rural locations, especially in the Canadian Rockies/Selkirk Mountains, became tourist destinations in their own right. After the success of the original Banff Springs Hotel, described as a "Tudor chalet in wood", CPR lobbied the government to create Banff National Park, the first in Canada. Indisputably, national parks protected CPH's commercial interests in such localities. The opportunity to participate in mountaineering excursions, led by professional Swiss guides, featured in CPH's promotion of the respective accommodation. Scenic images, often including a hotel, illustrated the CPH publicity brochures.

Urban and township land sales financed the construction of the early hotels. In the late-19th to early-20th century, CPH commonly adopted a châteauesque architectural style for building, or enlarging, significant hotels. The earliest example was Château Frontenac. Notable features included steeply pitched copper roofs, blue-green from oxidation, ornate gables, dormer windows, and an irregular placement of towers and turrets.

The visual appeal of this design prompted other railway companies to imitate it. CPR, or its later competitors, Canadian Northern Railway and Grand Trunk Pacific Railway that became Canadian National Railway (CN), built grandiose railway hotels in every major Canadian city. However, CPR quickly reverted to a simpler style of a flat roof and limited ornamental features when designing most city hotels.

With growing automobile traffic, and tourists seeking cheaper accommodation, CPH retained only the more profitable urban and destination hotels. The resort hotels opened in summer only. Year round opening began in 1969 for Banff Springs Hotel, and in 1974 for Chateau Lake Louise.

Bungalow camps & tea houses

Each bungalow camp, comprising a group of cabins with a communal lodge, was in a relatively remote forest area, reached by hiking or horseback. Although initially catering to an elite, mainly American, tourist, they ultimately attracted a broader audience. The log cabin at Lake Louise (1891–1893) was perhaps a forerunner to this concept. The subsequent adoption of the log design not only created a pioneer appearance, but also provided the necessary insulation for a cold mountainous region. CN copied the concept at Jasper Park Lodge. Despite the rustic cabin exteriors, the interiors contained the modern comforts of the period. Presented as more adventurous than a hotel stay, it was scarcely roughing it. Although primarily in the west, Ontario also had three camps.

The CPH rest structures and teahouses, at scenic locations along nearby trails, similarly adopted a rustic design. Teahouses existed at Summit Lake, Twin Falls, Natural Bridge, Lake Agnes and the Plain of Six Glaciers, the latter two still operating. Most rest houses were one-storey cabins at lower elevations.

CPH initially encouraged automobile travel by building camps along the Banff-Windermere Highway, which opened in 1923. In the 1930s, the term "bungalow" disappeared from the Canadian lexicon. When automobile vacationers switched to inexpensive campgrounds at this time, CPH disposed of the least profitable bungalow camps, followed by the remainder in the 1950s.

Later hotels
After a 24-year break in building or acquiring properties, CPH constructed a series of hotels and motels during 1955–1999. The larger ones mostly adopted the "Chateau" prefix. Several international properties were operated, before exiting that market.

Chains acquired

In 1988, CPR purchased the Canadian National Hotels chain, making Canadian Pacific Hotels and Resorts the nation's largest hotel owner. In 1998, CPR purchased the Canadian Delta Hotels chain and the international Princess Hotels chain. The following year, San Francisco-based Fairmont Hotels and Resorts chain was acquired. Minority shareholders were Kingdom Hotels (USA) Ltd. and Maritz Wolff & Co, each holding a 16.5 per cent interest. All CPH properties were branded as either Fairmont or Delta. In 2001, CPH was renamed Fairmont Hotels and Resorts. Later that year, Canadian Pacific Limited spun off all of its subsidiaries into separately traded companies, which included Fairmont Hotels and Resorts.

In 2006, Kingdom Hotels International and Colony Capital, which also owned the Raffles and Swissôtel chains, bought Fairmont. The following year, BC Investment Management Corp. bought Delta Hotels. In 2015, AccorHotels acquired a controlling interest in FRHI, adding the Fairmont, Raffles, and Swissôtel chains to its Luxury Hotel Brands portfolio. That year Marriott International bought the Delta chain.

Canadian portfolio

Once under CP brand

Bungalow camps

Hotels

Once under Delta brand
(See Delta Hotels)

US/international portfolio

Once under CP brand

Acquired Fairmont properties

Acquired Princess properties

Footnotes

References

Canadian Pacific Railway hotels
Hotel chains in Canada
Hotel and leisure companies of Canada
Canadian brands
Fairmont Hotels and Resorts
Scottish baronial architecture in Canada